William Sydney Robinson FAA (1876–1963), was an Australian businessman, industrialist, and diplomat. He founded Western Mining Corporation in Australia in 1933.

References

Fellows of the Australian Academy of Science
1876 births
1963 deaths
Australian businesspeople